The Great Britain Super League was a short lived field hockey tournament organised by Great Britain Hockey.

It was established in 2007 as a showcase for British hockey talent. The event was run from 2007 until 2012 and is now defunct. The inaugural teams were from England (Wessex Leopards, Saxon Tigers and Pennine Pumas), Scotland (Caledonian Cougars and Highland Jaguars) and Wales (Celtic Panthers) competing. Players from the national leagues represented their relevant region.

Winners

Men's Super League

Women's Super League

2006-2007 Super League

Men's standings

Final

Women's standings

Final

2007-2008 Super League

Men's standings

Final

Women's standings

Final

2008-2009 Super League

Men's standings

Women's standings

2009-2010 Super League

Men's standings

2010-2011 Super League

Men's standings

Women's standings

Final

2011-2012 Super League

Men's standings

Final

Women's standings

Final

References

2006–07 in European field hockey
2007–08 in European field hockey
2008–09 in European field hockey
2009–10 in European field hockey
2010–11 in European field hockey
2011–12 in European field hockey
field hockey
field hockey
field hockey
field hockey
field hockey
field hockey
Field hockey leagues in the United Kingdom
2007 establishments in the United Kingdom
Defunct sports leagues in the United Kingdom
Recurring sporting events established in 2007
Recurring sporting events disestablished in 2012